Christian Wilhelm von Faber du Faur (18 August 1780 in Stuttgart – 6 February 1857 in Stuttgart) was a painter and an officer in the army of the Kingdom of Württemberg. He first devoted himself to painting, but subsequently became a soldier, and as a lieutenant in the 25th Division (the Württemberg unit) of the III Corps of Napoleon's Grande Armée, served in the French invasion of Russia, which he sketched as it progressed. His sketches were exhibited in 1816, and subsequently he used them to produce color plates, and then in 1831-44 published some of them, with text, in a work entitled Blatter aus meinem Portefeuille im Laufe des Feldzugs 1812,. His most noteworthy paintings are The Passage of the Beresina, a work of great merit, and The Coffee-House at Wilna. He attained the rank of general in 1849.

Gallery

References

Attribution:
 

1780 births
1857 deaths
19th-century German painters
19th-century male artists
German male painters
Major generals of Württemberg
Artists from Stuttgart
German military personnel of the Napoleonic Wars
People from the Duchy of Württemberg
Chevaliers of the Légion d'honneur
Burials at Frankfurt Main Cemetery
Military personnel from Stuttgart